Bertrand is an unincorporated community in Gloucester County, New Brunswick, Canada. It held village status prior to 2023.

History

On 1 January 2023, Bertrand amalgamated with three villages and all or part of four local service districts to form the new town of Rivière-du-Nord. The community's name remains in official use.

Geography 
The community is located on the Acadian Peninsula at the mouth of the Caraquet River where it empties into Caraquet Bay, roughly 10 km west of Caraquet.  The community centres around the intersection of Route 11, Route 145 and Route 325.

Demographics 

Notable people

See also
List of communities in New Brunswick

References

Communities in Gloucester County, New Brunswick
Former villages in New Brunswick